Georg Köhler (1 February 1900 – 27 January 1972) was a German international footballer.

References

1900 births
1972 deaths
Association football midfielders
German footballers
Germany international footballers